As of October 2019, there are 29,811 bridges in Taiwan.

List
This is a list of bridges in Taiwan.
 Aowanda Suspension Bridge
 Beigang Tourist Bridge
 Danjiang Bridge
 Daxi Bridge
 Dijiu Suspension Bridge
 Fumei Suspension Bridge
 Gangkou Suspension Bridge
 Guandu Bridge
 Guchuan Bridge
 Houtanjing Sky Bridge
 Jinde Bridge
 Jinlun Bridge
 Ligang Bridge
 Longteng Bridge
 Luofu Bridge
 New Taipei Bridge
 Nuomi Bridge
 Old Dali Bridge
 Old Donghe Bridge
 Penghu Great Bridge
 Shigupan Tourist Bridge
 Tamsui Lover's Bridge
 Taipei Bridge
 Taiping Sky Bridge
 Teldreka Bridge
 Xikou Suspension Bridge
 Xiluo Bridge
 Xindong Bridge
 Xiwei Bridge

See also
 List of roads in Taiwan

References

 
Taiwan
Bridges
Bridges